Simply Market is a brand of French supermarkets formed in 2005. This brand is a new concept to eventually replace Atac supermarkets. The brand belongs to the AuchanSuper subsidiary that manages the branches of Auchan supermarkets. The group planned to open 500 Simply Market supermarkets in France by 2015.

History 
 1959 : Opened first supermarket in Bagneux Doc
 1985 : Creation of the first supermarket Atac
 1996 : Selling of the Docks de France group to Auchan
 1998 : Birth of the Atac group, a sibling of the Auchan Group.
 2005 : Launch of the brand Simply Market: opening of its first supermarket in Bagneux
 2009 : Launch of website 42 stores in Ile de France, home delivery or removed
 2009/2010 : Transformation of Atac supermarkets to Simply Market
 2016-2019: Transformation from Simply Market to Auchan Supermarche

Logo Design

References 

Supermarkets of France
Retail companies established in 2005
Supermarkets of San Marino
French brands